Lotoria grandimaculata, common name : the large spotted triton,  is a species of predatory sea snail, a marine gastropod mollusk in the family Cymatiidae.

Description

The shell size varies between 50 mm and 132 mm

Distribution
This species occurs in the Red Sea and in the Indian Ocean off East Africa; also off the Philippines.

References

 Spry, J.F. (1961). The sea shells of Dar es Salaam: Gastropods. Tanganyika Notes and Records 56

External links
 

Cymatiidae
Gastropods described in 1844